In tabletop role-playing games, a plot point is a resource possessed by a player which can be spent to alter the plot of the game.  The name is a pun on the TV and film term plot point.

Description
In most commercial RPGs, plot points represent the heroic quality of player characters, which separates them from other people in the game world, and as such are spent to increase a character's chance of success in combat or other actions.  Examples include Fate points in FATE (also RPGs based on the FATE system), Edge in MechWarrior, Fortune dice in Feng Shui or Force points in the Star Wars role-playing games from West End Games (Star Wars: The Roleplaying Game) and Wizards of the Coast (the Star Wars Roleplaying Game).

In some RPGs, mostly indie RPGs, plot points are rather a way of involving the player in the story.  They can be spent to introduce something into the game, or to add a previously unrevealed fact about a character.  Examples include story tokens in Capes, the seven types of Narrative privileges (Privilèges narratifs) in the 2nd edition of The Last Chronicles of Erdor (Les Chroniques d'Erdor, in French) or backgrounds in Dogs in the Vineyard.

In Steve Jackson Games's role-playing game Toon, plot points are used as experience points, awarded for completing in-game objectives and used to increase a player character's statistics.

The first role-playing game to incorporate plot points was Top Secret by TSR, Inc. which gave each character between 1-10 luck points. Each luck point allowed a player to reverse the consequences of a single roll.

Character creation in the Serenity Role Playing Game (2005) is point-based and players can use plot points to influence die rolls; this use of plot points has become standard for games based on dramatic licenses. In the Cortex System, players are encouraged to roleplay their disadvantages during play and are rewarded with plot points for doing so; though
most of Cortex is a traditional RPG system, the interrelation of plot points and complications was a trend toward the indie side of game design. In the Smallville Roleplaying Game, plot points have become a central resource; they're not only available through the use of complications but they are also usable to power superpowers, meaning that PCs build up problems, then solve them when super powers come out, much like the TV show. Leverage: The Roleplaying Game also featured a plot-point economy, built on distinctions.

References

Role-playing game terminology